Two human polls made up the 2004–05 NCAA Division I men's ice hockey rankings, the USCHO.com Division I Men's Poll and the USA TODAY/American Hockey Magazine Poll. As the 2004–05 season progressed, rankings were updated weekly. There were a total of 34 voters in the USA Today poll and 40 voters in the USCHO.com poll. Each first place vote in either poll is worth 15 points in the rankings with every subsequent vote worth 1 fewer point.

Legend

USA TODAY/American Hockey Magazine Poll

USCHO.com Division I Men's Poll

References

External links
USA Today/American Hockey Magazine Men's College Hockey Poll
USCHO.com Division I Men's Poll

Rankings
College men's ice hockey rankings in the United States